Helmi is a surname. Notable people with the surname include:

Amina Helmi, Argentinian astronomer
Mohamed Helmi, Egyptian footballer
Moustafa Helmi (1911–1992), Egyptian footballer
Yasmine Helmi, Egyptian sport shooter

See also

Helmy

fr:Helmi